Suite 16 is an album by multi-instrumentalist Yusef Lateef recorded in 1970 and released on the Atlantic label.

Track listing 
All compositions by Yusef Lateef except as indicated.
 "Buddy and Lou" - 3:13
 "Down in Atlanta" - 4:15
 "Nocturne" - 4:02
 "When a Man Loves a Woman" (Calvin Lewis, Andrew Wright) - 3:20
 "Michelle" (John Lennon, Paul McCartney) - 1:44
 "Symphonic Blues Suite: First Movement; Folia" - 2:21
 "Symphonic Blues Suite: Second Movement; Minuet (Hybird, Atonal)" - 2:10
 "Symphonic Blues Suite: Third Movement; Blues (Twelve Measure Form) Variational Interlude" - 6:53
 "Symphonic Blues Suite: Fourth Movement; Passacaglia" - 2:06
 "Symphonic Blues Suite: Fifth Movement; Chorale / Sixth Movement; Blues (Extended Form)" - 2:13
 "Symphonic Blues Suite: Seventh Movement; Blues, Coda" - 2:37
Recorded at Regent Sound Studios in New York City on April 6, 1970 (track 3), April 7, 1970 (track 4), April 8, 1970 (track 1), and April 9, 1970 (track 2) and at Corner Studios in Cologne, West Germany on June 24, 1970 (tracks 5-10)

Personnel 
Yusef Lateef - tenor saxophone, flute, bamboo flute, pneumatic bamboo flute, oboe, bells, tambourine
Neal Boyar - vibraphone (track 3)
Barry Harris (tracks 6-11), Joe Zawinul (tracks 1-4) - piano
Eric Gale (tracks 1-4), Earl Klugh (track 5) - guitar
Chuck Rainey - electric bass (tracks 1-4)
Robert Cunningham - bass, electric bass (tracks 6-11)
Albert Heath (tracks 6-11), Jimmy Johnson (tracks 1-4) - drums
Selwart Clarke - viola (tracks 2 & 4)
Kermit Moore - cello (tracks 2 & 4)
Cologne Radio Orchestra conducted by William S. Fischer (tracks 6-11)
The Sweet Inspirations - backing vocals (tracks 1-5)

References 

Yusef Lateef albums
1970 albums
Albums produced by Joel Dorn
Atlantic Records albums